Hermersberg is a municipality in Südwestpfalz district, in Rhineland-Palatinate, western Germany and belongs to the municipal association Waldfischbach-Burgalben. It is situated on the western edge of the Palatinate Forest, approx. 15 km northeast of Pirmasens, on top of the Sickingen Heights, and biggest settlement on top.

Inhabitants
69% of the population in Hermersberg is Catholic, 23% are Protestants; the evolution of population can be proven since 1800. From Year 1970 the number of inhabitants is slowly decreasing.

Evolution of population (since 1800):

References

Municipalities in Rhineland-Palatinate
Palatinate Forest
Südwestpfalz